Huangmei County falls under the administration of Huanggang City in eastern Hubei province, People's Republic of China, and borders Anhui to the east and Jiangxi to the south across the Yangtze. It also administers Shanjia Islet in the Yangzte.

Geography

Administrative divisions
Huangmei County administers:

As of 2013, the county jurisdiction over 12 towns, 4 townships, which are Huangmei town, Koike town, KONGLONG town, under the new town, big town, stopped before the town, Wuzu town, town Zhuo, Cai Town, the new open town, town alone, shunt town, fir Township, Liulin Township, Nigatake Township, township and Liu Zuo Nuebu Park management Office, management Office Longganghu.

History
In 845 BC Marquis Wen 文侯 Huang Meng 黃孟 (aka Huang Zhang 黃璋) moved the capital of the State of Huang from Yicheng to Huangchuan (present-day Huangchuan, Henan). Huang Xi's descendants ruled State of Huang until 648 BC when it was destroyed by the State of Chu. The Marquis of Huang, Marquis Mu 穆侯 Huang Qisheng 黃企生, fled to the state of Qi. The people of Huang were forced to relocate to Chu. They settled in the region of present-day Hubei province, in a region known as the Jiangxia Prefecture 江夏郡 during the Han dynasty (206 BC-AD 220). There are many places in this region today that were named after Huang e.g. Huanggang, Huangpi, Huangmei, Huangshi, Huangan, Huangzhou etc. A large number of the people of Huang were also relocated to regions south of the Yangtze River.

Climate

Huangmei opera
Huangmei is famous for its tea and tea-picking songs, which evolved into Huangmei opera. The opera was derived from caicha (tea-picking — cha means tea) tunes and folk ditties which people sang while picking tea. It is a combination of local folk songs, dances, and some ancient operas. Huangmei opera flourished in the 18th century to become one of the most famous traditional Chinese opera forms.

Transport
Huangmei is connected to Jiujiang by two bridges across the Yangtze River.

References

Counties of Hubei
Huanggang